Singida Urban District is one of the six districts of the Singida Region of Tanzania.  It is bordered to the south and west by the Ikungi District and to the north and east by the Singida Rural District. Its administrative seat is the town of Singida.

According to the 2012 Tanzania national census, the population of the Singida Urban District was 150,379.

Transport
Paved Trunk road T3 from Morogoro to the Rwandan border passes through the district. Paved trunk road T14 connects Singida with Babati in Manyara Region.

The Singida branch of the Central Line railway connects Singida with the town of Manyoni, which is on the main line.

Administrative subdivisions
As of 2012, Singida Urban District was administratively divided into 16 wards.

Wards

 Ipembe
 Kindai
 Majengo
 Mandewa
 Minga
 Misuna
 Mitunduruni
 Mtamaa
 Mtipa
 Mughanga
 Mungumaji
 Mwankoko
Unyianga
 Uhamaka 
 Unyambwa
 Unyamikumbi
 Utemini

References

Districts of Singida Region